The St. Joseph Valley Parkway is a freeway in the U.S. states of Indiana and Michigan, serving as a bypass route around Elkhart, Mishawaka, and South Bend in Indiana and Niles in Michigan. The freeway runs to the south and west of Elkhart and South Bend and Niles and consists of segments of U.S. Route 31 (US 31) and US 20; those two highway designations run concurrently at the southwestern rim of the South Bend metropolitan area. It continues north to run along the St. Joseph River valley.

The freeway was first built in Indiana in the 1960s, although plans in Michigan date back to the 1950s. Indiana completed its portion of the freeway in 1992, while Michigan opened its last segment in 2022.

Route description

The Parkway begins where US 20 expands to a divided highway southeast of Elkhart. To the east in Indiana the freeway feeds into an undivided segment of US 20 at County Road 17 (CR 17). From there it runs westward along the south sides of Elkhart and Mishawaka. South of South Bend, US 31 joins the Parkway, and then the Parkway turns northward along the west side of South Bend. Along this segment, US 20 turns back west and leaves the Parkway. The Parkway meets the Indiana Toll Road which carries I-80/I-90 before crossing the state line into Michigan. West of Niles, the Parkway meets US 12 and continues northwesterly running west of Berrien Springs. From there it runs northward to end at Napier Avenue east of St. Joseph. The St. Joseph Valley Parkway ends at Napier Avenue, but US 31 continues as a five-lane highway west along Napier to connect with I-94 and the rest of the US 31 routing north of there on I-196.

The Indiana Department of Transportation (INDOT) and the Michigan Department of Transportation (MDOT) both maintain the sections of the St. Joseph Valley Parkway in their respective states. Additionally, both departments have listed their freeway segments as part of the National Highway System, a system of roads important to the nation's economy, defense, and mobility. The two departments conduct surveys to measure the traffic levels along their roadways. This measurement is expressed in terms of annual average daily traffic (AADT) which is a calculation of the traffic volume on a stretch of roadway for any average day of the year. INDOT's figures for 2007 showed that 30,753 vehicles used the freeway near its western end. The traffic volume drops to 19,914 vehicles near the Indiana Toll Road. In Michigan, the levels drop as low as 7,402 vehicles near the Napier Road interchange.

History

Name
The "St. Joseph Valley Parkway" name was chosen by local chambers of commerce in the fall of 1992 as the result of a local contest held by a group of local businesses. The name was officially adopted by Michigan in 1993 (dedicated late 1995) and Indiana in 1995 (dedicated in mid-1995).

Indiana section
There had been a southern bypass of the South Bend and Elkhart areas planned since the 1930s. The first section of the highway, started in 1958 as Bypass US 20 (BYP US 20), was completed between US 20 and Mayflower Road (at the time State Road 123) on September 19, 1963. The freeway was extended to just past the SR 23 interchange in late Summer 1965, then further east to US 31, that section opening on December 15, 1967. The BYP US 20 designation was replaced by the US 31 designation in 1978. The exit with the Indiana East–West Toll Road/I-80/I-90 was built beginning in 1979 in conjunction with the northern extension to Michigan. Construction in the early 1990s extended the freeway in sections from US 31/Business US 31 (Bus. US 31) to its current end with US 20 at CR 17, with the portion from US 31/Bus. US 31 to SR 19 opening on December 11, 1991, and the portion from there to CR 17 opening on October 9, 1992. Ramps from Nimtz Parkway were opened November 3, 1997, and the portion in Elkhart was also named the "Dean R. Mock Expressway" in March 2002.

Michigan section
A plan to relocate US 31 in Berrien County, Michigan, existed as early as 1952. Planning to extend the South Bend Bypass northward into Michigan to I-96 (later I-196) began in 1962. A report issued in 1970 detailed four routing corridors, spawning a lawsuit over how Berrien Springs would be bypassed. Construction was to begin in 1975, but the Michigan State Highways Department delayed construction plans in 1972, pushing the start to 1977. The first section, running from the state line north to US 12, was completed and dedicated August 10, 1979, and opened to traffic by September 6 of that year. From there, US 31 was routed east along US 12 to Bus. US 12 and north along Bus. US 12 to the former routing of US 31/US 33. Final plans for the routing north to I-94 were approved in 1981. The Niles bypass section was opened August 16, 1987, bringing the freeway north to Walton Road northwest of Niles. Bus. US 31 was created along the former routing in Niles and Walton Road was rebuilt as a state trunkline connection between the northern end of the freeway and the former two-lane routing of US 31. The Berrien Springs bypass section was opened in late 1992, the southbound lanes opening on October 23 and the northbound on November 20. As a cost-saving measure, this section was initially an expressway with crossroads, and was converted to a freeway in stages through 1999. Since then, MDOT built a  freeway segment north to Napier Avenue that was opened on August 27, 2003 at a cost of $97 million (equivalent to $ in ). A proposed spur westward to I-94 in the Stevensville area was never built.

Extension to I-94

East of Benton Harbor, Michigan, the St. Joseph Valley Parkway extension was under study due to environmental, economical and historical site issues. One of the environmental concerns relates to the habitat of an endangered species, the Mitchell's satyr butterfly that has its habitat in the area of the freeway extension. The  habitat is home to the second-largest population of the rare butterfly. This freeway connection was originally approved in 1981 as part of a final environmental impact study that included the freeway built from Niles northward to Napier Avenue. Since that approval, the butterfly was discovered in the Blue Creek Fen in the late 1980s, and it was listed an endangered species in 1992. The listing stalled construction of the freeway north of Berrien Springs. The US Fish and Wildlife Service (USFWS) issued an opinion two years later that the freeway project would jeopardize the species. MDOT was given permission to modify the previously approved freeway to cross the Blue Creek on longer bridges; the USFWS also required that any construction be done from elevated platforms, among other restrictions. In the interim, MDOT proceeded with construction of the southern portion of the last freeway segment, completing the freeway northward from Berrien Springs to the Napier Avenue interchange in August 2003.

A revised environmental impact study to account for the butterfly's habitat was approved in 2004. The study compared the original proposal for this extension that involved connecting directly to I-196 at I-94 with a pair of alternate routes that involved connecting US 31 directly to BL I-94 at I-94 near Benton Harbor with auxiliary lanes to I-196. The recommendation was to use the PA-2 version of the alternative connection to avoid the Blue Creek Fen. At the time the last freeway segment was opened in 2003, MDOT expected the remaining segment would not take much longer to complete, but funding was not available for many years. Construction of the extension was not included for this reason in subsequent MDOT five-year highway projects plans, although most of the design work and land acquisition was identified in 2013 as having been finished. Funding for the project was listed in the 2017–21 plan draft released in July 2016, which split the remaining work into three phases. MDOT received a federal grant for the project in December 2018, citing at that time a completion date of 2022 or 2023 for the project; construction began in June 2020. The ribbon cutting for this section occurred on September 26, 2022. The new routing to I-94 formally opened on November 9, 2022. Until the freeway was completed, US 31 followed a stretch of Napier Avenue, which was upgraded in conjunction with the St. Joseph Valley Parkway opening to that point, westward to I-94. The St. Joseph Valley Parkway name was applied to the new freeway section.

Exit list

See also

Footnotes

References

External links

 US 31 Freeway in Berrien County at Michigan Highways
  Part 1 Part 2 Part 3

Freeways in the United States
U.S. Highways in Indiana
Freeways and expressways in Michigan
U.S. Route 20
U.S. Route 31
Transportation in South Bend, Indiana
Transportation in St. Joseph County, Indiana
Transportation in Elkhart County, Indiana
Transportation in Berrien County, Michigan